Džo is the cognate of Joe, and may refer to:

 Ljubisav Đokić
 Josip Šimunić